60 Days In is a television docuseries on A&E. Internationally it is known as The Jail: 60 Days In and airs in over 100 other countries. In the series, volunteers are incarcerated as undercover prisoners for 60 days.

The show premiered on March 10, 2016. Season 2 premiered August 18, 2016. Seasons 1 and 2 took place in Clark County Jail in Jeffersonville, Indiana.

Seasons 3 and 4 saw the show's setting moved to the Fulton County Jail in Atlanta.

The fifth season premiered on January 3, 2019. Season 5 took place in Florence, Arizona at the Pinal County Jail.

A spinoff titled 60 Days In: Narcoland was released on July 30, 2019.

On November 19, 2019, the show was renewed for a sixth season which takes place in the Etowah County Detention Center in Gadsden, Alabama and premiered on January 2, 2020.

On July 1, 2022, the show was announced to return for a seventh season, taking place at the Henry County Sheriff's Office in McDonough, Georgia, which premiered  on August 18, 2022. It was the first season in which the cast was composed entirely of former inmates.

Premise
The television series follows seven individuals as they volunteer to go undercover, spending 60 days as inmates in the Clark County Jail (also known as the Michael L. Becher Adult Correctional Complex), in Jeffersonville, Indiana. Their goal is to obtain evidence of questionable or illegal activities within the jail that might be missed by the correctional officers and surveillance systems.

The existence of the undercover program is kept secret from the inmates, the guards, and most of the jail officials. Prior to entering the jail, the volunteers receive instruction on how to act around other inmates, and they are each given a pseudonym and a cover story, including details of the (fake) criminal charges on which they were arrested. Although it was repeatedly mentioned that Maryum Ali was given an alias to use because of her famous father (boxer Muhammad Ali), it was later revealed that volunteer Robert was also using an alias while imprisoned, and that he would blow his cover if he visited an emergency room and gave his real name.

Because producers realized that it would be difficult for volunteers to remain undercover after the first season aired, a second season was produced before the series premiered. Representatives from A&E told Business Insider that multiple corrections officers were fired due to the program. According to the producers, valid legal releases to appear on television were obtained from inmates, but they were not told the actual reason that the releases were needed.

The importance of tater tots was revealed throughout the series. Inmates were frequently served tater tots on their meal trays. The potato-based food was occasionally used as currency, and was allegedly the cause of one of the fights on the show between two of the real inmates. The Clark County Sheriff's Office held a community fundraiser where they sold T-shirts and tater tots based on the show.

Season 2 began airing on Thursday August 18, 2016, with 60 Days In: Meet the Participants premiering on August 11. Season 2 episodes began airing on Wednesday, September 28, 2016 on Foxtel's crime + investigation network in Australia.

Cast

Season 1 cast
 Jamey Noel, the sheriff of Clark County, Indiana
 Scottie Maples, a public information officer. He takes responsibility for briefing the volunteers before the program begins and debriefing them afterward.
 Maryum May May Ali (Yasmin Brown), social worker
 Barbra Roylance Williams (Barbara Weldon), author
 Tami Ferraiuolo (Tami Ferguson), former police officer
 Jeffrey Downs, security officer
 Robert Holcomb, a teacher. He spent a month in solitary confinement during his five-week stay in jail for covering a security camera with a towel in an attempt to impress the other inmates. Despite desiring to continue on, he was removed from the program for medical reasons. He previously appeared on TLC's Extreme Time Cheaters.
 Isaiah Jenkins, recent high school graduate and brother of a current inmate. Jenkins reported on Twitter that he visited his jailed brother, who said, "Wassup, hot coffee?" The code phrases for the volunteers to be extricated from jail were "good coffee" or "hot coffee"). Isaiah had not previously appeared on television.
 Zachary Baker (Zac Holland), veteran

Season 2 cast
 Ashleigh Marie (Park) Baker, wife of season 1's Zachary Baker. She is an alcoholic and addict from childhood, but had been sober for four years before appearing on the show.
 Brian Thomas (J.D.), an attorney for the California Department of Corrections & Rehabilitation's Office of Legal Affairs' Employment Advocacy Prosecution Team. He is responsible for administratively prosecuting correctional officers who commit job-related misconduct. He entered the program to see how correctional officers behave when they believe nobody is looking. He exited the program after one week due to severe hazing, but was still able to provide valuable information at the debriefing session. He has since entered private practice and is practicing law in Southern California.
 Chris Graf entered the program to better understand how jail impacted his younger brother, a former inmate who served four months in jail.  He left the program within 24 hours after becoming violently ill and suffering from severe panic attacks.
 Dion Shepherd Jr., a criminology student from Detroit. He grew up one of nine siblings and his parents separated shortly after he was born. He felt he could have easily ended up behind bars like many of his friends and family. He was able to leave home without a criminal record and is about to receive a master's degree in Criminology, Law and Society.
 Monalisa Johnson, the founder of Parents of Incarcerated Children, a national support and advocacy group for parents with incarcerated children. Her daughter is serving a ten-year mandatory sentence.
 Quintin McShan, a recently retired state police captain and former member of the United States Marine Corps. He currently works as a licensed private investigator and bounty hunter.
 Sheri Ray, a former corrections officer and mother of three children. She is looking to re-enter her career after her husband's return from Afghanistan and learn from the show what changes she can make as she enters her field. After the program, Ray was offered a position at the Clark County Jail to continue her career as a corrections officer.
 Ryan Secord (Kyle Ryan), the youngest participant during this season, at 27 years old. He has a medical background and was a medic in the United States Army Reserves. He aspires to become a police officer and eventually a homicide detective. He opened his own store while in jail in order to make profit, and befriended several of the inmates, particularly Garza and Ricky.

Season 3 cast

  Mark Adger, colonel at the Fulton County Jail in Atlanta
 Calvin Crosby, a special education teacher at a local Public School. He hopes he will be able to relate to his students on a deeper level and he thinks it may shock them into changing their own behaviors and patterns.
 Don (last name unknown) grew up in the projects of Newark, Delaware. His father and two brothers were all in and out of prison during his youth. As a convicted felon, his father could never find a job, so he continually returned to selling and using drugs. Don believes that the system has failed African Americans. He wants to join the program in order to uncover discrimination, unite the inmates, and learn how to actively fight recidivism and the escalating trends of convicted black men in America.
 Gerson (last name unknown) moved from El Salvador to California when he was seven years old. He went from a civil war to a gang war, living in the Los Angeles area during the 1980s and 90s. He eventually left California and moved to the east coast as he worked to escape the risk of becoming a statistic by his surroundings, including gangs, drugs, and violence. He works as a mentor in schools, colleges and universities. When the program started, Gerson had concerns about it. He called the producer, met him at a hotel, and decided not risk it.
 Jessica Speigner-Page met her husband on an inmate pen pal site, and she was shocked at how institutionalized he was when he was released. After a decade behind bars, he was struggling to reintegrate. His "inmate-like" behavior has been a strain on their relationship. Speigner-Page is determined to understand where these behaviors and instincts of his come from in order to help him, and others who have been recently released, reintegrate into society. She believes this program will help her relate to her husband and strengthen their marriage. However, she left the program early.
  Jon McAdams, a veteran and former law enforcement agent who became disenchanted with the system and now wants to dedicate his professional life to civil rights activism. He plans on starting a nonprofit organization in his conservative town. He wants to "walk the walk" and put his words into action, starting by living among a population he once put behind bars but now wants to serve.
 Matt Michael served in the Marine Corps for four years. He was the honor graduate in his boot camp class, was promoted quickly, and ultimately attained the rank of Sergeant (E-5) in the infantry. He supports law enforcement, but he thinks the system needs a reality check. He believes if one has committed a serious crime, they should do their time.
 Mauri Jackson worked three years as a correctional officer in a men's maximum security facility. As CO, she was shocked by how many incarcerated men and women suffer from mental illness and are on medications while serving out their time behind bars. She is determined to be part of the solution when it comes to prison reform and mental health.
 Michelle Polley is currently working in property management, but has been interested in the criminal justice field all her life. She has taken various classes on criminal justice and criminal law. She hopes to connect with women inside through creating positive activities so they know there is more to life than four concrete walls.
 Nate Burrell served in active duty in the United States Marine Corps from 2006 to 2010 in the infantry, and completed two combat tours in Iraq. He served for three years in the reserves, and was honorably discharged in 2013. Subsequently, he received his associate degree in criminal justice and law enforcement in 2014 in order to become a fish and wildlife officer in Michigan. He decided to remain in custody for an additional 60 days when Colonel Adger offered him the opportunity to do so.

Season 4 cast

: Participant was removed for safety concerns and did not complete the program. 
: Participant left early and did not complete the program.

Season 5 cast

Season 6 cast

Season 7 cast

Episodes

Season 1 (2016)

Season 2 (2016–17)

Season 3 (2017)

Season 4 (2018)

Season 5 (2019)

Season 6 (2020)

Season 7 (2022)

References

External links
 
 

2016 American television series debuts
2010s American reality television series
2010s prison television series
2010s American legal television series
2020s American reality television series
2020s prison television series
2020s American legal television series
A&E (TV network) original programming
American prison television series
Jeffersonville, Indiana
Prisons in Indiana